The canton of Ceton is an administrative division of the Orne department, northwestern France. It was created at the French canton reorganisation which came into effect in March 2015. Its seat is in Ceton.

It consists of the following communes:
 
Appenai-sous-Bellême
Belforêt-en-Perche
Bellême
Bellou-le-Trichard
Ceton
La Chapelle-Souëf
Chemilli
Dame-Marie
Igé
Origny-le-Roux
Pouvrai
Saint-Fulgent-des-Ormes
Saint-Germain-de-la-Coudre
Saint-Hilaire-sur-Erre
Saint-Martin-du-Vieux-Bellême
Suré
Val-au-Perche
Vaunoise

References

Cantons of Orne